Favorite was an  of the French Navy. The boat was captured by the German in June 1940 and renamed UF-2 on 13 May 1941.

Career 
Favorite was laid down in December 1937 in Rouen, and launched in September 1938. She never participated in any patrols with the French Navy.

After her capture, she was commissioned into Nazi Germany's Kriegsmarine on 5 November 1942 and used as a training ship in the 5th Flotilla (Kiel) from November 1942 to August 1943, as well as in the U-Abwehrschule (Bergen), from August 1943 to July 1944. She was decommissioned on 5 July 1944, and scuttled at Gotenhafen in 1945.

See also 
List of submarines of France

References

Bibliography

External links

Aurore-class submarines
Ships built in France
1938 ships
World War II submarines of France
U-boats commissioned in 1942
U-boats scuttled in 1945
World War II submarines of Germany
Naval ships of France captured by Germany during World War II
Maritime incidents in 1945